William Charles Brice (3 July 1921 – 24 July 2007) was a British ethnographer and linguist.

Biography
Brice was born in Richmond, Yorkshire, and studied geography at Jesus College, Oxford, interrupting his studies to serve in India during the Second World War, protecting railways near Madras and supplying maps to troops, for which he was awarded the Burma Star. He then participated in an archaeological expedition to eastern Turkey, exploring frontier forts of the Roman empire. He was appointed lecturer in geography at Manchester University in 1947, returning to Oxford in 1951 as assistant curator and lecturer in ethnology at the Pitt Rivers Museum. Sir John Myres gave him the task of working on Linear A, and his breakthroughs were recorded in Inscriptions in the Minoan Linear Script of Class A (1961). In 1967 he was appointed as the editor of the journal Kadmos, which focused on prealphabetic writing and the languages and cultures from which they came. His works include An Historical Atlas of Islam (1981), The Mediterranean Sea Atlas (2003), translated from a 16th-century Arabic manuscript. and South-west Asia (A Systematic Regional Geography; vol. 8), University of London Press, 1966. He was also responsible for the 8th, 9th and 10th editions of Walter Fitzgerald's Africa (1955, 1961 & 1967).

References

1921 births
2007 deaths
Ethnographers
Linguists from the United Kingdom
Alumni of Jesus College, Oxford
Academics of the University of Oxford
Academics of the Victoria University of Manchester
People associated with the Pitt Rivers Museum
20th-century linguists